David A. Reidy (born 1962) is an American philosopher, currently the Distinguished Humanities Professor at University of Tennessee.

References

Living people
University of Tennessee faculty
American philosophers
University of Kansas alumni
Indiana University alumni
1962 births